Ballad of Tara (translit. Tcherike-ye Tara) is a 1979 Iranian film directed by Bahram Bayzai. It competed in the Un Certain Regard section at the 1980 Cannes Film Festival.

Cast
 Susan Taslimi - Tara
 Manuchehr Farid - Historical man
 Reza Babak - Ghalich
 Siamak Atlassi - Ashoob
 Mahin Deyham - Neighbor's wife
 Mohammad Poursattar
 Sami Tahasuni
 Reza Fayazi - Neighbour
 Sirus Hassanpur

References

External links

1979 films
Iranian drama films
1970s Persian-language films
1979 drama films
Films directed by Bahram Bayzai